Yvan Bourgis (born 24 September 1979 in Monistrol-sur-Loire) is a French football defender. He played for Stade Brest 29 over the eight seasons.

External links

1979 births
Living people
Stade Brestois 29 players
Clermont Foot players
Ligue 2 players
Association football defenders
French footballers